Żelazków  is a village in Kalisz County, Greater Poland Voivodeship, in west-central Poland. It is the seat of the gmina (administrative district) called Gmina Żelazków.

The village has a population of 1,250.

References

Villages in Kalisz County